Aqel Biltaji (10 February 1941 – 28 February 2021) was a Jordanian,Palestinian  politician, who served as the mayor of Amman.

Career
Biltaji was appointed by the government mayor of the Greater Amman Municipality in September 2013,  from that date until August 2017. He  occupied several positions over the course of his life, in Royal Jordanian Airlines and most famously as Minister of Tourism and tourism adviser to King Abdullah II and as chief of Aqaba's city council. From 2002 to 2004, he was the first Chief Commissioner of the newly created Aqaba Special Economic Zone.

Death
On 28 February 2021, Biltaji died from complications related to COVID-19 during the COVID-19 pandemic in Jordan.

Awards
  Highest Jordanian Orders
  Austrian Grand Gold Merit
  Royal Norwegian Order of Merit
  Gran Cruz
  French Commandeur de la Legion d'Honeur
  French Grand Maitre de la Legion d'Honeur
  Ordre National du Mérite
source:

References

1941 births
2021 deaths
Government ministers of Jordan
Mayors of Amman
Jordanian people of Palestinian descent
Grand Cross of the Order of Civil Merit
Commandeurs of the Légion d'honneur
Deaths from the COVID-19 pandemic in Jordan